West Edmonton Mall (WEM) is a shopping mall in Edmonton, Alberta, that is owned, managed, and operated by Triple Five Group. It is the second most visited mall in Canada, after the Toronto Eaton Centre in Toronto, followed by Metrotown Mall in Burnaby, and the 14th largest in the world (along with The Dubai Mall) by gross leasable area. It is the second largest shopping mall, by square footage, in North America behind the Mall of America. Mall of America encompasses  and West Edmonton Mall encompasses . By store count, West Edmonton Mall is the highest in the Western Hemisphere as it currently counts over 800 occupants, in comparison to Mall of America's 520 occupants. The mall was founded by the Ghermezian brothers, who emigrated from Iran in 1959. The mall's major anchor stores are Hudson's Bay, London Drugs, Marshalls, Simons, The Brick, and Winners/HomeSense.

It holds over 800 stores and services including nine attractions, two hotels and over 100 dining venues in the complex, and parking for more than 20,000 vehicles. More than 24,000 people are employed at the property. The mall receives about 32 million visitors per year; it attracts between 90,000 and 200,000 shoppers daily, depending on the day and season.

History
West Edmonton Mall first opened its doors to the public on 15 September 1981. The mall was developed in four phases, completed in 1981, 1983, 1985, and 1999. It was the largest indoor shopping centre in the world until 2004, and was named such in the Guinness Book of Records. The four phases of construction are used in a colour-coded system as a guideline for finding stores and attractions. The indoor roller coaster, The Mindbender had a fatal accident on 14 June 1986 when one of the rear cars derailed from the track and slammed into a nearby concrete pillar. Three people died and one was injured in the accident.

On 23 December 2000, a 22-year-old man drowned in a recreational lagoon. A man matching his description was seen swimming at about 2:30 am as the nearby drinking establishments had closed, though a second security check did not find anyone in the lagoon area. The man's body was found around 10:30 am later that morning, fully clothed except for his shoes and jacket, which were never located. He is believed to have accidentally drowned while under the influence of drinking alcohol and cannabis.

On 11 July 2004, the mall suffered millions of dollars in damage when a severe storm of hail and rain caused roofs to fail and drains to overflow. The Ice Palace and surrounding sections were the most damaged, and the World Waterpark had a sewage overflow. The damage was promptly repaired.

Former tenants
Sears Canada (closed 8 January 2018, was replaced by a now-closed West 49 outlet on the Main level and Stitches Factory Outlet on the Upper level. Replaced by The Brick on the Upper Level on September 7, 2019 , and West Edmonton Mall Toyota on the lower level on October 18/2021.) (Phase I)
Target Canada (closed 2015, now Winners/Homesense on the 1st floor and Structube, Buy Buy Baby, and  Alberta Academy of Aesthetics on the 2nd floor) (Phase I)
Zellers (Store 294) (closed 2012, replaced with Target Canada in 2013 which closed in 2015.) (Phase I)
Red's (closed June 2006, now Ed's Bowling) (Phase II)
Woodward's (closed 1993, became the second Hudson's Bay store in the mall, store closed in 1998 and redeveloped into Phase IV)
Second Bay Store (closed 1998, now Scotiabank Theatre, Sunrise Records, Bubba Gump Shrimp Company, Lego Store, and a few more stores)
HMV (Closed 2017, now Sunrise Records and later in 2021 on main floor Toys "R" Us, now-closed and vacant)
Toys "R" Us (Opened November 2021, Closed December 2022)
Eatons (Closed 1999, replaced with Zellers in 2000) (Phase I)
RAAS (Now closed, replaced by Lego) (phase IV)

World records
Current West Edmonton Mall world records include;

World's largest indoor lake - Deep Sea Adventure Lake
World’s largest indoor wave pool - World Waterpark
World’s tallest indoor permanent bungee tower (no longer in use but still there) - World Waterpark
World's largest parking lot with more than 20,000 spaces, and over 10,000 overflow spaces. - WEM's parking lot

Other records (past)

World's largest indoor shopping mall (until 2004)
World's tallest indoor roller coaster - the Mindbender
 Most bungee jumps in 24 hours record while indoors was set by Peter Charney, on 6–7 November 2007 at the World Waterpark, completing 225 jumps.

Major attractions

Galaxyland Powered By Hasbro 

Galaxyland was originally known as "Fantasyland"; however, during a court battle with the Walt Disney Company, West Edmonton Mall changed the park's name to Galaxyland in July 1995 after completing major renovations. It undertook a complete redesign from the original theme, old Victorian fantasy, to a galactic space theme. It is an indoor amusement park on the north side of the mall and is the second-largest indoor amusement park in the world, behind Ferrari World, and features 24 rides and attractions. There are eight beginner rides, nine intermediate rides and seven thrill rides. The latest attraction in Galaxyland is Havoc, which opened in 2018. Management closed Drop of Doom in the early 2000s. The tower area was replaced shortly after by a more modern launch ride, the Space Shot, a S&S Double Shot Tower Ride. In late 2019, the park announced a new partnership with Hasbro, with several rides and attractions being rebranded with Hasbro toy brands. The renovation was scheduled to finish by winter 2020, and eventually had its grand opening as Galaxyland Powered by Hasbro on December 17, 2022.

World Waterpark

The park has the world's largest indoor wave pool.

In 2018–2019, the waterpark underwent a $2.5 million renovation. The renovations included new paint jobs to the Corkscrew slide, the handrails, and the Blue Thunder Wave Pool. Bathrooms were introduced to a more convenient location, as well as a rooftop balcony on top of the bathrooms for social gatherings. A hot dog stand, Tiki Dog, was added.

Along with Galaxyland, the World Waterpark was closed on March 16, 2020, in response to the COVID-19 pandemic.  Both reopened in July 2021.

Ice Palace

Ice Palace is a scaled-down version of a National Hockey League (NHL) regulation-sized ice rink in the centre of the mall. The Edmonton Oilers occasionally practised at the Ice Palace during the 1980s. The Oilers' contract for using the rink has since expired. The rink is used for various hockey and other sporting tournaments. In 2015, the Ice Palace was renamed Mayfield Toyota Ice Palace after the mall sold the naming rights to a local auto dealership.

During special events, such as Remembrance Day, the ice rink is covered for ceremonies. In July 2017, West Edmonton Mall announced that the Mayfield Toyota Ice Palace would get a $3 million renovation. It closed for the summer and reopened in December 2017.

Professor WEM's Adventure Golf

Professor WEM's Adventure Golf is an 18-hole miniature golf course. The miniature golf course was originally known as Pebble Beach Mini Golf, and was designed to be a mini golf version of Pebble Beach Golf Links. The course was refurbished and given the Professor WEM theme in the mid-1990s.

Other attractions

 Fantasyland Hotel, located within the mall; WEM is also affiliated with a second hotel, the West Edmonton Mall Inn, across the street from the shopping centre on 90th Avenue.
 An indoor shooting range (named "Wild West Shooting Centre")
 Large-scale replica of the Santa María, one of the ships sailed by Christopher Columbus in 1492 to San Salvador Island. The deck can be booked for private functions.
 24-hour Gym, Crunch Fitness
 Dinner Theatre: Jubilations Dinner Theatre offers original Canadian three-act musical comedies along with a four-course dinner. Full bar service is available and the theatre's productions run Wednesday to Sunday. This space was formerly a Famous Players cinema.
 Previously, the mall has had a history of nightclubs and recreation spaces including the Empire Ballroom, Edmonton Events Centre (now demolished), The Joint and Ka'os Nightclub. The former Edmonton Events Centre space has been purchased by Gateway Casinos & Entertainment for their expansion of the Palace Casino, which was renamed to Starlight Casino. (Phase II)
 The Rec Room
 West 49 skate shop, built in the 1st floor in Phase II, in former movie theatre, with a indoor skatepark in the basement then moved to former Sears temporarily, when DRIVE Go Karts moved in, before moving back to Phase II in a different store space then before. Stitches Factory Outlet takes the 2nd floor. (Phase I)
 West Edmonton Christian Assembly (WECA), an inter-denominational chapel (Phase III)
 Three radio stations: 97.3 K-Rock (classic rock), 840 CFCW (classic country and news programming), 96.3 The Breeze, are owned by Stingray Radio. The Stingray-owned area features studios, offices, and a small free museum. Stingray studios are in Phase IV, with the broadcast studios visible from the mall (illuminated "on air" signs indicate when broadcasts are underway from those studios). (Phase III)
Dragon's Tale Black-lit Mini Golf is near Galaxyland, along with the Crystal Labyrinth Mirror Maze.
From 1985 to 2005 a Deep Sea adventure ride took visitors on a narrated tour of the lake in one of four submarines. The submarines have now been removed but guests can still visit the Marine Life at Sea Life Caverns — an underground aquarium that is home to more than 100 species of fish, sharks, sea turtles, penguins, reptiles, amphibians and invertebrates.  Or watch the free daily sea lion shows.

Themed streets

The mall also includes several theme areas including:

 Brbn St. (Bourbon Street): Features clubs and restaurants in a New Orleans-influenced setting. Several restaurants and clubs are here including 1st Rnd, Boston Pizza, Earl's, Hudson's Canadian Tap House, Marble Slab Creamery, Moxie's Classic Grill, Mr Mikes Steakhouse & Bar, Rick Bronson's the Comic Strip, the Old Spaghetti Factory. The lighting in this area is left dim to simulate a nighttime atmosphere. The area can be closed off from the rest of the mall, allowing for the hosting of special events, and for its establishments to stay open past the closing time of the rest of the mall. As part of the 2011–2014 mall renovations, this area was renovated and Bourbon Street was renamed Brbn St.
 Europa Boulevard: Eclectic shops in an area designed to look like a European streetscape. It is home to Europa Watch & Jewelry, Fleurs Flowers, Opulence, G-Star Raw, Plush Skateboard Shop, Dr. Martens, B3, Waffloos, FYidoctors, Yasmin, Stitch It, and several rentable conference rooms that look down on the Boulevard. Also, Europa Boulevard is home to the first La Maison Simons to open outside Quebec.
 Chinatown: Asian-themed area anchored by a T & T Supermarket (in the former Canadian Tire location). It is directly above Bourbon Street. The Chinatown signage was removed in May 2012 and the section, though it still maintains an Asian décor, is no longer exclusive to such businesses.

Shops & Services
West Edmonton Mall is home to more than 800 stores and services including twelve world-class attractions, two hotels, over 100 dining venues, the widest variety of one-of-a-kind retailers, and entertainment for all ages.  Recent tenants include:

L.L.Bean
Louis Vuitton
Gucci
Tiffany & Company
Coach
Saint Laurent

Upgrades

Construction on a total renovation of the mall shopping areas through all the phases began in spring 2011. The 'face lift' included the renovation of all mall common areas, which started in Phase I and finished in Phase IV. The most notable upgrades included the retrofit of an existing water fountain into new choreographed musical dancing fountains, hanging decor of ceramic roses in the Rose Court outside Victoria's Secret and glass oil droplets around the Oilmen Statue outside the Phase I Food Court. Most of the renovations were completed in 2014, however some areas of the mall continue construction, such as Park Lane and Chinatown.

In 2017, the mall announced that the Mayfield Toyota Ice Palace would undergo a renovation, retrofitting it with the latest technologies including modern lighting and sound. The Ice Palace closed in mid 2017 and reopened in December. Later in mid 2018, the mall announced that the World Waterpark would undergo renovations worth $2.5 million in September 2018. All upgrades have since been completed.

In 2021 local car dealership Mayfield Toyota made their move to the mall and rebranded as West Edmonton Mall Toyota which is the world’s largest full service in mall dealership. The dealership has developed and is in the old Sears retail space.

Since 2019, the mall has added several high-end retailers in phase III including Gucci, Tiffany’s, Balenciaga, Saint Laurent, Louis Vuitton.

Future developments

In 2002, the City of Edmonton approved plans for the mall to expand with an additional  of retail space, a facility for sports, trade shows and conventions, a 12-storey office building, and a 600-unit apartment building, along with more parking. However, none of these projects has begun construction except for the completed parking lot expansion by the Rec Room.

As part of Mayfield Toyota’s move to the mall, the project is yet to include the addition of a  parkade with 1,000 parking stalls and valet service.

Security
In February 2015, the jihadist terrorist group al-Shabaab released a propaganda video calling for attacks on West Edmonton Mall and other Western shopping centres. Although the group had hitherto never launched attacks in North America, security at the mall was tightened in response. The Royal Canadian Mounted Police also indicated that there was no evidence of any imminent threat.

In response to growing security threats, West Edmonton Mall developed a lockdown protocol in case of major emergencies.  drills continued to be executed every two to three months.

Controversies
In 2011, a video recording allegedly showed WEM security assaulting a woman after arresting her for trespassing. A judge agreed to release the video after charges against the woman were dismissed.

West Edmonton Mall Transit Centre

The West Edmonton Mall Transit Centre is a major hub of the Edmonton Transit Service (ETS).  As of August 2021, it is in a temporary location on 90 Avenue beside the West Edmonton Mall Inn.  This is due to the upcoming construction of the LRT system's Valley Line West  elevated station.

The permanent transit centre is on the south side of West Edmonton Mall, outside mall entrance 48. Buses using the transit centre enter and exit from 87 Avenue. The large shelter building at the transit centre is accessible and equipped with power doors. This transit centre has vending machines and a payphone but no park and ride, public washrooms, or drop-off area. The transit centre is served by ETS and St. Albert Transit.

$3 million in upgrades to the transit centre were completed in June 2017 and included a new heated indoor shelter (double the size of the previous shelter), new sidewalks, new lighting, and a new public art installation, among other changes.

The following bus routes serve the transit centre:

See also
List of shopping malls in Canada
List of largest enclosed shopping malls in Canada
List of largest shopping malls in the world

References

External links

 

Tourist attractions in Edmonton
Shopping malls in Edmonton
Shopping malls established in 1981
IMAX venues
1981 establishments in Alberta